Djamel Bouras (born 11 August 1971 in Givors, Rhône) is a French judoka of Algerian origin.

He won a gold medal in the 1996 Olympic Games in Atlanta.

See also
List of sportspeople sanctioned for doping offences

References

External links
 
 Video footage of Djamel Bouras (judovision.org)

1971 births
Living people
People from Givors
French male judoka
Judoka at the 1996 Summer Olympics
Judoka at the 2000 Summer Olympics
Olympic judoka of France
Olympic gold medalists for France
French sportspeople of Algerian descent
French sportspeople in doping cases
Olympic medalists in judo
Medalists at the 1996 Summer Olympics
Mediterranean Games bronze medalists for France
Mediterranean Games medalists in judo
Competitors at the 1997 Mediterranean Games
Sportspeople from Lyon Metropolis